is a Japanese actor and voice actor who is affiliated with Gekidan Nihonjido. He is originally from Kanagawa Prefecture.

Filmography

Live action
Bakuryuu Sentai Abaranger (2003) (Takaaki Utsumi)

Television animation
Fruits Basket (2001) (Kyo Sohma (child))
Yu-Gi-Oh! Zexal (2011) (Three (III))
Ginga e Kickoff!! (2012) (Tagi Sugiyama)
Haikyū!! (2014-) (Sō Inuoka and Yukitaka Izumi)
Layton Mystery Tanteisha: Katori no Nazotoki File (2018-19) (Noah Montol)
SD GUNDAM WORLD SANGOKU SOKETSUDEN (2019) (Zhao Yun Gundam 00)

OVA
Final Fantasy VII Advent Children (2005) (Denzel)

Theatrical animation
Naruto the Movie 3: Guardians of the Crescent Moon Kingdom (2006) (Hikaru Tsuki)

Dubbing

Live-action
Black Nativity (Langston (Jacob Latimore))
Charlie and the Chocolate Factory (Charlie Bucket (Freddie Highmore))
Cinderella Man (Jay Braddock (Connor Price))
Knives Out (Jacob Thrombey (Jaeden Martell))

Animation
Arthur 3: The War of the Two Worlds (Arthur)
Brother Bear (Koda)
Brother Bear 2 (Koda)
Finding Nemo (Turtles)

References

External links

1992 births
Living people
Japanese male child actors
Japanese male video game actors
Japanese male voice actors
Male voice actors from Kanagawa Prefecture